During the 2009–10 Peterborough United F.C. season saw the club play in the Football League Championship after promotion from Football League One in 2008–09.

Squad

Competitions

Championship

Table

FA Cup

League Cup

References 

2009-10
2009–10 Football League Championship by team